In Islamic cosmology, Zurah is a pilgrimage site that was originally built by Adam. It was lifted into the fourth level of Jannah during the time of Noah when the Flood occurred. It was the precursor to the Kaaba.

References

Kaaba
Islamic terminology
Pilgrimage